The forty-sixth season of the NBC sketch comedy series Saturday Night Live premiered on October 3, 2020, during the 2020–21 television season with host Chris Rock and musical guest Megan Thee Stallion, and concluded on May 22, 2021, with host Anya Taylor-Joy and musical guest Lil Nas X. With the previous season cut short amid the COVID-19 pandemic and the show instead airing three remotely produced episodes referred to as Saturday Night Live at Home, the season premiere marked the return to Studio 8H at 30 Rockefeller Plaza in New York City. Lorne Michaels said that the show aimed to have a "limited" in-studio audience, and that they would "work closely with Gov. Cuomo's team."

Cast
On September 15, 2020, it was announced that the entire cast from last season would be returning, with Ego Nwodim, who had been a featured player since 2018, being promoted to repertory status, while Chloe Fineman and Bowen Yang, both of whom had been hired in 2019 for the previous season, remained as featured players. 

On September 16, prior to the start of the season, SNL staff writer Andrew Dismukes, Upright Citizens Brigade alum Lauren Holt, and stand-up comedian Punkie Johnson were added to the cast as featured players. The same day of Dismukes, Holt, and Johnson's additions to the cast, it was announced that Alec Baldwin and Maya Rudolph, though not members of the cast, would reprise their respective roles as Donald Trump and Kamala Harris, while Jim Carrey would take over impersonating Joe Biden. Biden had been portrayed by Jason Sudeikis while he was vice president and by Woody Harrelson, John Mulaney, and Sudeikis the previous season. On December 19, Carrey announced he would step down from playing Biden, stating it was the original intention that he would play Biden for only six weeks. Current cast member Alex Moffat succeeded Carrey to portray as Biden during the cold open of the episode hosted by Kristen Wiig.

Cecily Strong was absent from the first six episodes of the season due to filming commitments for her Apple TV+ series Schmigadoon!. Aidy Bryant appeared in the season premiere before taking an extended absence due to filming commitments for her show Shrill. Both Strong and Bryant were still credited as cast members throughout the season. 

This was the final season for longtime cast member Beck Bennett, who had been on the show since 2013, a total of 8 seasons. It was also Holt's only season on the show, as she was let go after the finale.

Cast roster

Repertory players
 Beck Bennett
 Aidy Bryant
 Michael Che
 Pete Davidson
 Mikey Day
 Heidi Gardner
 Colin Jost
 Kate McKinnon
 Alex Moffat
 Kyle Mooney
 Ego Nwodim
 Chris Redd
 Cecily Strong
 Kenan Thompson 
 Melissa Villaseñor

Featured players
 Andrew Dismukes
 Chloe Fineman
 Lauren Holt
 Punkie Johnson
 Bowen Yang

bold denotes "Weekend Update" anchor

Crew

Prior to the start of the season, Anna Drezen was promoted to co-head writer alongside Michael Che, Colin Jost, and Kent Sublette, making her the first female head writer since Sarah Schneider. Celeste Yim was added to the writing staff.

Episodes

Specials

Notes

References

46
Saturday Night Live in the 2020s
2020 American television seasons
2021 American television seasons
Television shows directed by Don Roy King